The spotted flat lizard (Platysaurus maculatus) is a lizard in the Cordylidae family, which is native to Mozambique.

The spotted flat lizard has two subspecies, P. m. maculatus and P. m. linecauda. Both were described in 1965.

The species is known as the spotted flat lizard because they use narrow cracks in flat rocks to hide and retreat from predators.

See also 
 Platysaurus
 Cordylidae

References

External links 
 More Information on The Reptile Database

Platysaurus
Lizards of Africa
Endemic fauna of Mozambique
Fauna of Southern Africa
Reptiles of Mozambique
Reptiles described in 1965
Taxa named by Donald George Broadley